The Happy Line is a monorail line in central Shenzhen. The line is a loop and has seven stations, including stops at Splendid China, Happy Valley, Window of the World, and China Folk Culture Village.

Technical information 

The monorail trains were built by Intamin with a fleet of five P28/24 class, three-car trains, each with a capacity of 24 passengers per train. The trains use 380 V 50 Hz AC power supply, and are equipped with four  AC motors and two  variable-frequency drives. Under normal circumstances, there are 5 trains running on the track at the same time.

The line features a maximum grade of 10%. Its maximal speed is 40 km per hour.

Operations 
The operating hours of Happy Route are 9:30am-6:30pm on weekdays and 9am-7pm on weekends. The fare is RMB 50.

Accident 
At 11am on 1 November 2018, a system failure occurred on the Happy Line, causing a collision between the third and fourth cars carrying more than 20 people. This accident caused one person a head injury, one person a waist injury and other passengers with minor injuries to varying degrees.

References

External links 
 The official map
 Video: Happy Line round trip view from inside monorail train

Monorails
Monorails in China
Transport in Shenzhen
People Porter people movers
Railway loop lines
Railway lines opened in 1998